Andres or Andrés is a male given name.  It can also be a surname. It is derived from the name Andreas.

Given name

Andres
Andrés Aguilar Mawdsley (1924-1995), Venezuelan lawyer and diplomat
Andres Allan (1965–1988), Estonian poet
Andres Alver (born 1953), Estonian architect
Andres Ammas (1962–2018), Estonian politician
Andres Anvelt (born 1969), Estonian politician
Andres Ehin (1940–2011),  Estonian writer, editor, poet and translator
Andres Gerber (born 1973), Swiss football player
Andres Heinapuu (born 1954), Estonian bibliographer and politician 
Andres Herkel (born 1962), Estonian politician
Andres Ilves, Estonian-American journalist
Andres Kasekamp (born 1966), Estonian-Canadian historian and political scientist
Andres Keevallik (born 1943), Estonian mechanical scientist and educator
Andres Kollist (born 1948), Estonian chemist, librarian, politician and activist 
Andres Koort (born 1969), Estonian artist
Andres Kork (born 1950), Estonian surgeon and politician
Andres Küng (1945–2002), Estonian-Swedish journalist, writer, entrepreneur and politician
Andres Labrakis (born 1940), Greek wrestler
Andres Langemets (born 1948), Estonian publicist and poet
Andres Larka (1879–1943), Estonian military commander and politician
Andres Lauk (born 1964), Estonian cyclist
Andres Lavik (1852–1941), Norwegian farmer and politician
Andres Lepik (born 1957), Estonian actor
Andres Levin, Venezuelan-American musician, producer and filmmaker
Andres Lipstok (born 1957), Estonian economist and politician
Andres Luure (born 1959), Estonian philosopher, translator and researcher
Andres Mähar (born 1978), Estonian actor
Andres Maimik (born 1970), Estonian film director, producer, screenwriter, cinematographer and actor
Andres Marin (born 1983), Colombian-American rock climber
Andres Metsoja (born 1978), Estonian politician
Andres Metspalu (born 1951), Estonian geneticist
Andres Nuiamäe (1982–2004), Estonian soldier
Andres Ojamaa (1969–1993), Estonian badminton player
Andres Olvik (born 1986), Estonian swimmer
Andres Oper (born 1977), Estonian football player
Andres Põder (born 1949), Estonian clergyman
Andres Põime (born 1957), Estonian architect
Andres Puustusmaa (born 1971), Estonian actor and director
Andres Raag (born 1970), Estonian actor and singer
Andres Raja (born 1982), Estonian decathlete
Andres Salumets (born 1971), Estonian biologist, biochemist and educator
Andres Serrano (born 1950), American photographer
Andres Siim (born 1962), Estonian architect
Andres Skuin (1962–2003), Estonian volleyball player and coach
Andres Sõber (born 1956), Estonian basketball player and coach
Andres Spokoiny (born 1968), NYC based Argentine Jewish activist
Andres Sutt (born 1967), Estonian politician
Andres Tabun (born 1954), Estonian actor
Andres Tarand (born 1940), Estonian politician and geographer
Andres Toode (born 1957), Estonian volleyballer and coach
Andres Unga (born 1966), Estonian diplomat
Andres Varik (born 1952), Estonian politician and agronomist 
Andres Veiel (born 1959), German film director and screenwriter
Andres Vooremaa (born 1944), Estonian chess player
Andres Võsand (born 1966), Estonian tennis player
Andres Aggy (born 1990), American aspiring senior lab tester

Andrés
Andrés Amaya ( - 1704), Spanish Baroque painter
Andrés Bello (1781–1865), Venezuelan-Chilean poet, philosopher and politician
Andrés Bonifacio (1863–1897), Filipino nationalist and revolutionary
Andrés Calamaro (born 1961), Argentine musician
Andrés Cantor (born 1962), Argentine-American sportscaster
Andrés Cepeda (born 1973), Colombian singer and songwriter
Andrés Duany (born 1949), Cuban-American architect and urban planner
Andrés Escobar (1967–1994), Colombian football player
Andrés Galarraga (born 1961), Venezuelan baseball player
Andrés Giménez (born 1998), Venezuelan baseball player
 Andrés Guajardo (1930–2000), Spanish jurist, businessman and politician 
Andrés Guardado (born 1986), Mexican football player
Andrés Indriðason (1941–2020), Icelandic television producer
Andrés Iniesta (born 1984), Spanish football player
Andrés Machado (born 1993), Venezuelan baseball player
Andrés Manuel López Obrador (born 1953), Mexican politician
Andrés Muñoz (born 1999), Mexican baseball player
Andrés Oppenheimer (born 1951), Argentine-American journalist
Carlos Andrés Pérez (1922–2010), Venezuelan president
Andrés Rodríguez (politician) (1923–1997), Paraguayan general and president
Andrés Segovia (1893–1987), Spanish classical guitarist
Andrés Thomas (born 1963), Dominican Republic baseball player
Andrés Velencoso (born 1978), Spanish model

Surname

Andres
Emil Andres (1911–1999), American racecar driver
Ernie Andres  (1918–2008), American basketball player
Gerd Andres (born 1951), German politician
Heinrich Andres (1883–1970), German botanist
Jo Andres (born 1954), American filmmaker, choreographer, and artist
Marion Andres (born 1958), Filipino politician
Stefan Andres (1906–1970), German writer

Andrés
José Andrés (born 1969), Spanish chef

Estonian masculine given names
Spanish masculine given names
Norwegian masculine given names